India competed at the 2013 Summer Universiade in Kazan, Russia from 6 to 17 July 2013. 37 athletes are a part of the Indian contingent.

India has won 1 silver medal.

Medalists

References

Nations at the 2013 Summer Universiade
India at the Summer Universiade
2013 in Indian sport